Becquerelite is a uranium mineral with the chemical formula: Ca(UO2)6O4(OH)6·8(H2O). It is a secondary mineral which contains calcium and is a bright yellow colour. It has a Mohs hardness of about 2.

It was named after the French physicist Antoine Henri Becquerel (1852–1908), who discovered radioactivity in 1896. Becquerelite contains about 70% uranium by weight.

It is mainly mined in Kasolo of the former Zaire, in the present day Democratic Republic of the Congo.

References

Uranium(VI) minerals
Oxide minerals
Orthorhombic minerals
Minerals in space group 33
Uranium mining in the Democratic Republic of the Congo